Esther Henseleit (born 14 January 1999) is a German professional golfer and member of the Ladies European Tour and LPGA Tour.

Amateur career
Henseleit attended Freie Waldorfschule Oldenburg and played for Golfclub am Meer before switching to Hamburg Golf Club in 2013. She joined the German national team in 2014 and finished third at the 2016 International Amateur Championship. In 2017 she was selected for the Junior Solheim Cup and in 2018 she was runner-up at the European Ladies Amateur Championship, one stroke behind Celia Barquín. She won the 2018 German National Amateur and the German Team Amateur Championship as well as the European Ladies' Club Trophy with Hamburg GC.

Professional career
Henseleit turned professional in January 2019 (with an EGA handicap of +7.1) after finishing third at Qualifying School for the 2019 Ladies European Tour. She won the Skaftö Open on the LET Access Series and qualified for the 2019 U.S. Women's Open at a sectional qualifying tournament. 

Henseleit finished second at four LET tournaments, the Omega Dubai Moonlight Classic, La Reserva de Sotogrande Invitational, Ladies European Thailand Championship and the Estrella Damm Mediterranean Ladies Open, one stroke behind Carlota Ciganda. In December, with her maiden LET win at the Magical Kenya Ladies Open, she secured both LET Order of Merit and LET Rookie of the Year, becoming only the third player after Laura Davies in 1985 and Carlota Ciganda in 2012 to manage this feat.

In November 2019, Henseleit gained 2020 LPGA Tour membership through Q-Series.

In February 2022, she successfully defended her title at the Magical Kenya Ladies Open.

Amateur wins
2014 German National Girls Championship
2018 German National Amateur, European Ladies' Club Trophy

Source:

Professional wins (3)

Ladies European Tour wins (2)

LET Access Series (1)

Team appearances
Amateur
European Girls' Team Championship (representing Germany): 2014, 2015, 2017
European Ladies' Team Championship (representing Germany): 2016, 2018
Espirito Santo Trophy (representing Germany): 2016, 2018
Junior Solheim Cup (representing Europe): 2017

Source:

References

External links

German female golfers
Ladies European Tour golfers
LPGA  Tour golfers
Sportspeople from Hamburg
1999 births
Living people
21st-century German women